The shorttail fanskate (Sympterygia brevicaudata) is a species of fish in the family Arhynchobatidae. It is found in the western Pacific Ocean off Chile, Ecuador, and Peru. Its natural habitat is shallow seas.

Sources

Sympterygia
Fish described in 1877
Taxonomy articles created by Polbot